Olokizumab is an immunomodulator. It binds to interleukin 6. Hence acting as an Anti-IL-6 therapeutic aimed at inflammatory disease e.g. rheumatoid arthritis (RA).

It had promising results in a phase II trial against placebo or tocilizumab for patients with moderate to severe whan.

Olokizumab was approved for medical use in Russia. On May 21, 2020, the Russian Health Ministry approved brand name Artlegia (olokizumab).

Olokizumab (64 mg once) is used as emergence experimental cytokine storm COVID-19 complications treatment.

In a 24-week, Phase 3, multicenter, placebo- and active-controlled trial, olokizumab (at a dose of 64 mg every 2 or 4 weeks) was superior to placebo and noninferior to adalimumab in producing a response at 12 weeks.

References

External links 

 

Monoclonal antibodies